Anisa Yotpinit (born June 23, 1998 in Ratchaburi) is a Thai indoor volleyball player. She is a current member of the Thailand women's national volleyball team.

Career
Anisa played with the club Sisaket for the 2012–13 season.

Clubs
  Sisaket (2012–2013)
  Suan Sunandha (2013–2014)
  Sisaket (2014–2015)
  Bangkok (2015–2018)
  Opart 369 (2018–2019)
 Diamond Food  (2020)
  Pro Flex VC (2020-2021)

Awards

Individuals
 2015 PEA Junior Championship - "Best Libero"
 2016 PSL Invitational Cup - "Best Libero"

National team

U23 team 
 2015 Asian Championship -  Silver Medal
 2017 Asian Championship -  Silver Medal

U20 team 
 2016 Asian Championship -  Bronze Medal

U18 team 
 2014 Asian Championship -  Silver Medal

References

External links
 FIVB Biography

1998 births
Living people
Anisa Yotpinit
Anisa Yotpinit
Anisa Yotpinit
Anisa Yotpinit